Cod. 44 A 8 also known as MS 1449, Bibliotheca dell'Academica Nazionale dei Lincei e Corsiniana,  is a Fechtbuch compiled by Peter von Danzig in 1452. Danzig was a 15th-century German fencing master. He was counted among the 17 members of the "society of Johannes Liechtenauer".

It reports teachings of Johannes Liechtenauer, Andres Lignitzer, Martin Hundfeld and Ott Jud, as well as original material by Peter von Danzig.

Andres Lignitzer (Andreas Liegnitzer, Andrew of Liegnitz) was an early 15th- or late 14th-century German fencing master. His teachings are preserved by the mid-15th-century masters Peter von Danzig and Paulus Kal. Paulus Kal name him together with his brother Jacob as members of the "Liechtenauer society". He may be identical with  Andres Jud ("Andres the Jew") named in 3227a.

An English translation of the treatise was published by Tobler (2010).

See also
 Historical European Martial Arts
 German school of swordsmanship

Literature
 Christian Henry Tobler, In Saint George's Name: An Anthology of Medieval German Fighting Arts  (2010),

External links
https://web.archive.org/web/20060913000000/http://de.wikisource.org/wiki/Cod._44_A_8
http://www.schielhau.org/von.danzig.html

1452 books
Combat treatises
15th-century illuminated manuscripts